Bradykinin receptor B1 (B1) is a G-protein coupled receptor encoded by the BDKRB1 gene in humans. Its principal ligand is bradykinin, a 9 amino acid peptide generated in pathophysiologic conditions such as inflammation, trauma, burns, shock, and allergy. The B1 receptor is one of two of G protein-coupled receptors that have been found which bind bradykinin and mediate responses to these pathophysiologic conditions.

B1 protein is synthesized de novo following tissue injury and receptor binding leads to an increase in the cytosolic calcium ion concentration, ultimately resulting in chronic and acute inflammatory responses.

Classical agonist of this receptor includes bradykinin1-8 (bradykinin with the first 8 amino acid) and antagonist includes [Leu8]-bradykinin1-8.

Antagonists
 LF22-0542

See also
 Bradykinin receptor

References

External links

Further reading

G protein-coupled receptors